

See also 
 Ronald S. Baron

References

Lists of entertainers